The 2020 mayoral election of Dhaka North City Corporation was held on 1 February 2020. A total of 6 candidates participated in the election. The result was a victory for the Awami League candidate Atiqul Islam. However, the results were rejected by main opposition candidate, Tabith Muhammad Awwal of Bangladesh Nationalist Party.

It was the first major election in Bangladesh conducted entirely using electronic voting machines (EVMs) alongside the 2020 Dhaka South City Corporation election. Previously the country had made only limited use of EVMs. The ruling Awami League supported the adoption of EVMs. BNP and Communist Party of Bangladesh leaders said they feared the machines would be used for vote rigging. One concern expressed was that the machines do not have a voter-verified paper audit trail.

Results

References 

2020 elections in Bangladesh
Local elections in Bangladesh
Dhaka